Sir Reginald Charles Halse KBE CMG (16 June 1881 – 9 August 1962) was the Bishop of Riverina from 1925 to 1943 and then Archbishop of Brisbane until his death in 1962.

Halse was educated at St Paul's School, London and Brasenose College, Oxford. He was ordained in 1906 and was an assistant priest at St Saviour's Poplar and then priest in charge of St Nicholas' Blackwall. He then emigrated to Australia and was Warden of the Brotherhood of St Barnabas and then headmaster of All Souls' School, Charters Towers, Queensland until his ordination to the episcopate. He was translated to Brisbane in 1943 and knighted in 1962. He died in office on 9 August 1962.

References

1881 births
People educated at St Paul's School, London
Fellows of Brasenose College, Oxford
Anglican bishops of Riverina
20th-century Anglican bishops in Australia
20th-century Anglican archbishops
Anglican archbishops of Brisbane
Australian Knights Commander of the Order of the British Empire
Australian Companions of the Order of St Michael and St George
1962 deaths